Sérgio Geraldo de Alencar Rodrigues (14 February 1930 – 17 August 2014) was an international freestyle swimmer and water polo player from Brazil. At the 1948 Summer Olympics in London, he finished 8th in the 4×200-metre freestyle final, and swam the 100-metre freestyle, not reaching the finals. At the 1952 Summer Olympics in Helsinki, he participated in the water polo, finishing 13th.

References

External links 
 
 

1930 births
2014 deaths
Brazilian male freestyle swimmers
Brazilian male water polo players
Swimmers at the 1948 Summer Olympics
Olympic swimmers of Brazil
Olympic water polo players of Brazil
Water polo players at the 1952 Summer Olympics